Bahij Hojeij is a Lebanese film director and screenwriter, born in Zahle, Lebanon in 1948.

Selective filmography

Cinema
- "Ring of Fire" (2003)

- "Fire Belt" (95 min), 2004
- "Here Comes the Rain" (100 min), 2010

- "Good Morning" (86 Min) 2018

Television
- "Al Oumbachi" (1987)
TV series based on the work of Lebanese writer Maroun Abboud.
10 episodes of 50 minutes produced and broadcast by Lebanese Broadcasting Corporation (LBC).
- “Beyrouth, Paris, Beyrouth” (1989) 
About the Lebanese community in France during the civil war of Lebanon.

Documentaries
- "The Green Line"(40 min), 1998. 
- "Beyrouth, le dialogue des ruines". (52 min), 1993.
- "Défi à l'oubli" (1996–1997) La Direction Générale des Antiquités. 40 minutes réhabilitation du Musée National de Beyrouth.
- "Beyrouth dévoile ses trésors." (1997) produit par l'UNESCO Beyrouth 
- “Kidnapped” (1998) Documentaire 52 min sur les 17 000 disparus de la guerre au Liban 
- “Lebanon, messages from a holy land”(2000). Documentaire de 35 minutes
- “Les moissons de la mémoire” (2001) le Ministère de la Culture Un documentaire de 15 minutes sur les Archives Nationales
- “Cités d’Orient , Beyrouth“ (2003)
- "The Maameltein Bridge" (2006).

Prix et distinctions

Cinema
- "Fire Belt" (95 min)
Silver Pheasant Award, Kerala Film Festival (India), 2004 
FIPRESCI Award (International Cinema Ciritcs Federation) Kerala Film Festival (India), 2004
Best female supporting actor : Julia Kassar, Carthage Film Festival, Tunisia, 2004

Documentaries
- "Défi à l'oubli" (1997) Best documentary. Beirut film festival, 1997
- "Kidnapped" (1998) Prix CMCA. Best Mediterranean documentary, Palerma, Italy 1998

References

Living people
Lebanese film directors
1948 births
Lebanese documentary film directors
Lebanese documentary filmmakers
Lebanese screenwriters